Taconic Hills High School is a secondary school in Craryville, New York, United States operated by Taconic Hills Central School District. It serves all or part of the communities of Copake, Hillsdale, Philmont, Ancram, Austerlitz, Claverack, Gallatin, Ghent, Livingston, Northeast and Taghkanic in the southeastern part of Columbia County, New York, United States.

The high school is located on a campus in Craryville NY which is also used by Taconic Hills Elementary School.

References

External links

Public high schools in New York (state)
Schools in Columbia County, New York